Panchkhapan is an urban municipality out of five urban municipalities of Sankhuwasabha District in Province No. 1 of Nepal. It lies on 87°12'12" E to 87°26'45" E Longitude and 27°17'37.4" N to 27°24'38" N Latitude. The municipality was established on 3 March 2017 merging former VDCs: Syabun, Jaljala and Wana. The area of the municipality is 148.03KM2 and according to 2011 census of Nepal the population of the municipality is 17,521.

The municipality is surrounded by Taplejung District in east, Savapokhari in north, Khandbari in north-west and west and Chainpur in south.

References

Populated places in Sankhuwasabha District
Municipalities in Koshi Province
Nepal municipalities established in 2017
Municipalities in Sankhuwasabha District